Vave V. Founuku was a Tuvaluan politician who served as Speaker of Parliament from 1981 to 1989. 

Founuku represented Niutao.
Founuku was elected to represent the Niutao electorate in the 1981 general election. He was re-elected in the 1989 general election. He was re-elected in the first 1993 general election and also in the second 1993 general election. Following the 1998 general election he was succeeded by Samuelu Teo.

References

Members of the Parliament of Tuvalu
People from Niutao
Year of birth missing
Possibly living people
Speakers of the Parliament of Tuvalu